The 2019 Chicago Cubs season was the 148th season of the Chicago Cubs franchise, the 144th in the National League and the Cubs' 104th season at Wrigley Field. The Cubs were managed by Joe Maddon, in his fifth year as Cubs manager, and played their home games at Wrigley Field as members of Major League Baseball's National League Central Division.

The Cubs began the season on the road against the Texas Rangers on March 28 and ended it at the St. Louis Cardinals on September 29. They finished the season 84–78 to finish in third place in the Central Division. The Cubs failed to make the playoffs for the first time since 2014. Prior to the end of the season, the Cubs announced that Joe Maddon would not return as manager for the 2020 season.

Previous season 
The Cubs finished the 2018 season 95–67 to earn a tie with the Milwaukee Brewers for the division. They lost to the Brewers in a 163rd game to determine the Central Division champions, failing in their quest to win the division for a third consecutive year. Instead, they hosted the Wild Card Game against the Colorado Rockies, but the Cubs lost 2–1 in 13 innings.

Television broadcasts 
The 2019 season marked the last full year of Cubs' television broadcasts on WGN-TV, the FTA broadcaster for over 71 straight years beginning in 1948. It was announced that, effective from the spring training season of 2020, the Cubs were moving to a new regional cable TV channel, the Marquee Sports Network, making them the fourth team overall to have their own cable station. WLS-TV Channel 7 was the team's secondary over-the-air broadcaster for the season, but did not extend its contract. It was also the final season to be aired over NBC Sports Chicago.

Offseason

Transactions

October 2018 

Source

November 2018 

Source

December 2018 

Source

January 2019 

Source

February 2019 

Source

March 2019 

Source

Regular season

Game log 

|- style=background:#cfc
| 1 || March 28 || @ Rangers || 12–4 || Lester (1–0) || Minor (0–1) || — || Globe Life Park || 48,538 || 1–0 || W1
|- style=background:#fbb
| 2 || March 30 || @ Rangers || 6–8 || Kelley (1–0) || Edwards Jr. (0–1) || Leclerc (1) || Globe Life Park || 46,238 || 1–1 || L1
|- style=background:#fbb
| 3 || March 31 || @ Rangers || 10–11 || Leclerc (1–0) || Strop (0–1) || — || Globe Life Park || 36,812 || 1–2 || L2
|-

|- style=background:#fbb
| 4 || April 1 || @ Braves || 0–8 || Parsons (1–1) || Hendricks (0–1) || — ||  || 41,912 || 1–3|| L3
|- style=background:#fbb
| 5 || April 3 || @ Braves || 4–6 || Jackson (1–0) || Cishek (0–1) ||  || SunTrust Park || 37,398 || 1–4 ||L4
|- style=background:#fbb
| 6 || April 4 || @ Braves || 4–9 || Fried (1–0) || Darvish (0–1) || — || SunTrust Park || 33,815 || 1–5 || L5
|- style=background:#fbb
| 7 || April 5 || @ Brewers || 10–13 || Anderson (1–0) || Quintana (0–1) || — || Miller Park || 34,926 || 1–6 || L6
|- style=background:#cfc
| 8 || April 6 || @ Brewers || 14–8 || Hamels (1–0) || Burnes (0–1) || — || Miller Park || 42,790 || 2–6 || W1
|- style=background:#fbb
| 9 || April 7 || @ Brewers || 2–4 || Davies (1–0) || Hendricks (0–2) || Hader (5) || Miller Park || 40,322 || 2–7 || L1
|- style=background:#cfc
| 10 || April 8 || Pirates || 10–0 || Brach (1–0) || Taillon (0–2) || — || Wrigley Field || 40,692 || 3–7 || W1
|- style=background:#fbb
| 11 || April 10 || Pirates || 2–5 || Lyles (1–0) || Darvish (0–2) || Vázquez (3) || Wrigley Field || 32,798 || 3–8 || L1
|- style=background:#cfc
| 12 || April 11 || Pirates || 2–0 || Quintana (1–1) || Musgrove (1–1) || Strop (1) || Wrigley Field || 31,906 || 4–8 || W1
|- style=background:#cfc
| 13 || April 12 || Angels || 5–1 || Hamels (2–0) || Skaggs (1–2) || — || Wrigley Field || 30,102 || 5–8 || W2
|- style=background:#fbb
| 14 || April 13 || Angels || 5–6 || Buttrey (1–0) || Hendricks (0–3) || Allen (4) || Wrigley Field || 38,755 || 5–9 || L1
|- style=background:#bbb
| — || April 14 || Angels ||colspan="8"|Postponed (snow) (Makeup date: June 3)
|- style=background:#cfc
| 15 || April 15 || @ Marlins || 7–2 || Darvish (1–2) || Richards (0–2) || — || Marlins Park || 9,888 || 6–9 || W1
|- style=background:#cfc
| 16 || April 16 || @ Marlins || 4–0 || Quintana (2–1) || López (1–3) || – || Marlins Park || 8,137 || 7–9 ||W2
|- style=background:#cfc
| 17 || April 17 || @ Marlins || 6–0 || Hamels (3–0) || Alcántara (1–2) || — || Marlins Park || 10,247 || 8–9 || W3
|- style=background:#cfc
| 18 || April 19 || Diamondbacks || 5–1 || Hendricks (1–3) || Kelly (1–2) || Strop (2) || Wrigley Field || 33,938 || 9–9  || W4
|- style=background:#fbb
| 19 || April 20 || Diamondbacks || 0–6 || Greinke (3–1) || Darvish (1–3) || Clarke (1) || Wrigley Field || 37,667 || 9–10 || L1
|- style=background:#cfc
| 20 || April 21 || Diamondbacks || 2–1 || Strop (1–1) || Bradley (1–2) || — || Wrigley Field || 38,181 || 10–10 || W1
|- style=background:#cfc
| 21 || April 23 || Dodgers || 7–2 || Quintana (3–1) || Maeda (3–2) || — || Wrigley Field || 35,536 || 11–10 || W2
|- style=background:#cfc
| 22 || April 24 || Dodgers || 7–6 || Brach (2–0) || Alexander (1–1)  || Strop (3) || Wrigley Field || 35,743 || 12–10 || W3
|- style=background:#fbb
| 23 || April 25 || Dodgers || 1–2 || Báez (2–1) || Lester (1–1) || Jansen (8) || Wrigley Field || 35,451 || 12–11 || L1
|- style=background:#fbb
| 24 || April 26 ||  || 3–8 || Ray (1–1) || Hendricks (1–4) || Andriese (1) || Chase Field || 30,664 || 12–12 || L2
|- style=background:#cfc
| 25 || April 27 || @ Diamondbacks || 9–1 || Darvish (2–3) || Godley (1–2) || — || Chase Field || 27,793 || 13–12 || W1
|- style=background:#cfc
| 26 || April 28 || @ Diamondbacks || 6–5 (15) || Chatwood (1–0) || Andriese (3–2) || Webster (1) || Chase Field || 29,477 || 14–12 || W2
|- style=background:#cfc
| 27 || April 30 || @ Mariners || 6–5 || Brach (3–0)  || Brennan (1–2) || Cishek (1) || T-Mobile Park || 27,545 || 15–12 || W3
|-

|- style=background:#cfc
| 28 || May 1 || @ Mariners || 11–0 || Lester (2–1) || Gonzales (5–1) || — || T-Mobile Park || 29,471 || 16–12 || W4
|- style=background:#cfc
| 29 || May 3 || Cardinals || 4–0 || Hendricks (2–4) || Flaherty (3–2) || — || Wrigley Field || 34,978 || 17–12 || W5
|- style=background:#cfc
| 30 || May 4 || Cardinals || 6–5 || Kintzler (1–0) || Brebbia (1–1) || Strop (4) || Wrigley Field || 39,601 || 18–12 || W6
|- style=background:#cfc
| 31 || May 5 || Cardinals || 13–5 || Quintana (4–1) || Wainwright (3–3) || — || Wrigley Field || 36,499 || 19–12 || W7
|- style=background:#fbb
| 32 || May 6 || Marlins || 5–6 || Conley (1–3) || Strop (1–2) || Romo (6) || Wrigley Field || 34,555 || 19–13 || L1
|- style=background:#cfc
| 33 || May 7 || Marlins || 5–2 || Cishek (1–1) || Conley (1–4) || — || Wrigley Field || 35,274 || 20–13 || W1
|- style=background:#cfc
| 34 || May 8 || Marlins || 3–2 (11) || Edwards Jr. (1–1) || Quijada (0–1) || — || Wrigley Field || 37,241 || 21–13 || W2
|- style=background:#cfc
| 35 || May 9 || Marlins || 4–1 || Montgomery (1–0) || Richards (0–5) || — || Wrigley Field || 32,301 || 22–13 || W3
|- style=background:#fbb
| 36 ||  || Brewers || 0–7 || González (1–0) || Quintana (4–2) || — || Wrigley Field || 37,870 || 22–14 || L1
|- style=background:#cfc
| 37 || May 11 || Brewers ||  || Chatwood (2–0)  || Smith (0–1) || — || Wrigley Field || 39,598 || 23–14 || W1
|- style=background:#cfc
| 38 || May 12 || Brewers || 4–1 || Lester (3–1) || Chacín (3–4) || Cishek (2) || Wrigley Field || 37,267 || 24–14 || W2
|- style=background:#cfc
| 39 || May 14 || @ Reds || 3–1 || Hendricks (3–4) || Roark (3–2) || Cishek (3) ||  || 16,853 || 25–14 || W3
|- style=background:#fbb
| 40 || May 15 || @ Reds || 5–6 (10) || Garrett (3–1) || Brach (3–1) || — || Great American Ball Park || 17,101 || 25–15 || L1
|- style=background:#fbb
| 41 || May 16 || @ Reds || 2–4 || Castillo (5–1) || Quintana (4–3) || Iglesias (9) || Great American Ball Park || 18,739 || 25–16 || L2
|- style=background:#cfc
| 42 || May 17 ||  || 14–6 || Hamels (4–0) || Scherzer (2–5) || — || Nationals Park || 33,296 || 26–16 || W1
|- style=background:#fbb
| 43 || May 18 || @ Nationals || 2–5 || Strasburg (4–3) || Lester  (3–2) || Doolittle (8) || Nationals Park || 37,582 || 26–17 || L1
|- style=background:#cfc
| 44 || May 19 || @ Nationals || 6–5 || Hendricks (4–4) || Hellickson (2–3) || Cishek (4) || Nationals Park || 23,244 || 27–17 || W1
|- style=background:#fbb
| 45 || May 20 || Phillies || 4–5 (10) || Neris (1–1) || Ryan (0–1) || Nicasio (1) || Wrigley Field || 37,909 || 27–18 || L1
|- style=background:#cfc
| 46 || May 21 || Phillies || 3–2 || Ryan (1–1) || Nicasio (0–2) || — || Wrigley Field || 36,768 || 28–18 || W1
|- style=background:#cfc
| 47 || May 22 || Phillies || 8–4 || Chatwood (3–0) || Irvin (2–1) || — || Wrigley Field || 39,246 || 29–18 || W2
|- style=background:#fbb
| 48 || May 23 || Phillies || 7–9 || Nola (5–0) || Lester (3–3) || Neris (8) || Wrigley Field || 37,173 || 29–19 || L1
|- style=background:#fbb
| 49 || May 24 || Reds || 5–6 || Hernandez (1–2) || Cishek (1–2) || Iglesias (11) || Wrigley Field || 35,266 || 29–20 || L2
|- style=background:#cfc
| 50 || May 25 || Reds || 8–6 || Maples (1–0) || Hughes (2–2) || Chatwood (1) || Wrigley Field || 40,929 || 30–20 || W1
|- style=background:#fbb
| 51 || May 26 || Reds || 2–10 || Roark (4–3) || Quintana (4–4) || — || Wrigley Field || 40,884 || 30–21 || L1
|- style=background:#fbb
| 52 || May 27 || @ Astros || 5–6 || Cole (5–5) || Hamels (4–1) ||Osuna (14) || Minute Maid Park || 42,135 || 30–22 || L2
|- style=background:#fbb
| 53 || May 28 || @ Astros || 6–9 || James (2–0) || Lester (3–4) || Osuna (15) || Minute Maid Park || 31,030 || 30–23 || L3
|- style=background:#cfc
| 54 || May 29 || @ Astros || 2–1 || Hendricks (5–4) || Miley (5–3) || Cishek (5) || Minute Maid Park || 33,243 || 31–23 || W1
|- style=background:#fbb
| 55 || May 31 || @ Cardinals || 1–2 || Hicks (2–2) || Montgomery (1–1) || — || Busch Stadium || 45,321 || 31–24 ||L1
|-

|- style=background:#fbb
| 56 || June 1 ||  || 4–7 || Gant (4–0) || Chatwood (3–1) || Martínez (1) || Busch Stadium || 46,297|| 31–25 || L2
|- style=background:#fbb
| 57 || June 2 || @ Cardinals || 1–2 || Wainwright (5–5) || Hamels (4–2) || Gant (3) || Busch Stadium || 46,053 || 31–26|| L3
|- style=background:#cfc
| 58 || June 3 || Angels || 8–1 || Lester (4–4) || Cahill (2–6) || — || Wrigley Field || 39,843 || 32–26 || W1
|- style=background:#cfc
| 59 || June 4 || Rockies || 6–3 || Hendricks (6–4) || Hoffman (1–2) || Strop (5) || Wrigley Field || 36,753 || 33–26 || W2
|- style=background:#cfc
| 60 || June 5 || Rockies || 9–8 || Kintzler (2–0) || Márquez (6–3) || Cishek (6) || Wrigley Field || 35,395 || 34–26 || W3
|- style=background:#fbb
| 61 || June 6 || Rockies || 1–3 || Lambert (1–0) || Quintana (4–5) || Oberg (3) || Wrigley Field || 36,375 || 34–27 || L1
|- style=background:#cfc
| 62 || June 7 || Cardinals || 3–1 || Hamels (5–2) || Mikolas (4–6) || Strop (6) || Wrigley Field || 40,671 || 35–27 || W1
|- style=background:#cfc
| 63 || June 8 || Cardinals || 9–4 || Lester (5–4) || Brebbia (1–3) || — || Wrigley Field || 41,005 || 36–27 ||  W2
|- style=background:#cfc
| 64 || June 9 || Cardinals || 5–1 || Hendricks (7–4) || Wainwright (5–6) || Strop (7) || Wrigley Field || 39,545 || 37–27 || W3
|- style=background:#fbb
| 65 ||  || @ Rockies || 5–6 || Oberg (4–0) || Cishek (1–3) || Davis (8) || Coors Field || 44,859 || 37–28 || L1
|- style=background:#fbb
| 66 || June 11 || @ Rockies || 3–10 || Lambert (2–0) || Quintana (4–6) || — || Coors Field || 43,126 || 37–29 || L2
|- style=background:#cfc
| 67 || June 12 || @ Rockies || 10–1 || Hamels (6–2) || Senzatela (5–5) || — || Coors Field || 47,412 || 38–29 || W1
|- style=background:#fbb
| 68 || June 13 || @ Dodgers || 3–7 || Kershaw (6–1) || Lester (5–5) || Urías (3) || Dodger Stadium || 44,970 || 38–30 || L1
|- style=background:#fbb
| 69 || June 14 || @ Dodgers || 3–5 || Hill (4–1) || Hendricks (7–5) || Jansen (20) || Dodger Stadium || 46,631 || 38–31 || L2
|- style=background:#cfc
| 70 || June 15 || @ Dodgers || 2–1 || Ryan (2–1) || Jansen (2–2) || Strop (8) || Dodger Stadium || 51,596 || 39–31 || W1
|- style=background:#fbb
| 71 || June 16 || @ Dodgers || 2–3 || Stripling (3–2) || Cishek (1–4) || Jansen (21) || Dodger Stadium || 53,817 || 39–32 || L1
|- style=background:#fbb
| 72 || June 18 || White Sox || 1–3 || Marshall (3–0) || Strop (1–3) || Colomé (15) || Wrigley Field || 41,192 || 39–33 || L2
|- style=background:#bfb
| 73 || June 19 || White Sox || 7–3 || Lester (6–5) || Giolito (10–2) || — || Wrigley Field || 39,776 || 40–33 || W1
|- style=background:#bfb
| 74 || June 20 || Mets || 7–4 || Alzolay (1–0) || Lockett (0–1) || Cishek (7) || Wrigley Field || 38,956 || 41–33 || W2
|- style=background:#fbb
| 75 || June 21 || Mets || 4–5 || Pounders (1–0) || Brach (3–2) || Díaz (16) || Wrigley Field || 41,078 || 41–34 || L1
|- style=background:#fbb
| 76 || June 22 || Mets || 2–10 || Wheeler (6–5) || Quintana (4–7) || — || Wrigley Field || 41,106 || 41–35 || L2
|- style=background:#bfb
| 77 || June 23 || Mets || 5–3 || Cishek (2–4) || Lugo (3–1) || Strop (9) || Wrigley Field || 39,077 || 42–35 || W1
|- style=background:#bfb
| 78 || June 24 || Braves || 8–3 || Lester (7–5) || Teherán (5–6) || — || Wrigley Field || 37,603 || 43–35 || W2
|- style=background:#fbb
| 79 || June 25 || Braves || 2–3 || Fried (9–3) || Montgomery (1–2) || Jackson (12) || Wrigley Field || 37,333 || 43–36 || L1
|- style=background:#fbb
| 80 || June 26 || Braves || 3–5 || Keuchel (1–1) || Darvish (2–4) || Minter (4) || Wrigley Field || 38,017 || 43–37 || L2
|- style=background:#bfb
| 81 || June 27 || Braves || 9–7 || Chatwood (4–1) || Tomlin (1–1) || Kimbrel (1) || Wrigley Field || 39,823 || 44–37 || W1
|- style=background:#fbb
| 82 || June 28 || @ Reds || 3–6 || Gray (4–5) || Hamels (6–3) ||Lorenzen (5) ||  || 36,919 || 44–38 || L1
|- style=background:#bfb
| 83 || June 29 || @ Reds || 6–0 || Quintana (5–7) || Castillo (7–3) || — || Great American Ball Park || 41,360 || 45–38 || W1
|- style=background:#fbb
| 84 || June 30 || @ Reds || 6–8 || DeSclafani (5–4) || Lester (7–6) || Iglesias (14) || Great American Ball Park || 31,165 || 45–39 || L1
|-

|- style=background:#fbb
| 85 || July 1 || @ Pirates || 5–18 || Williams (3–2) || Alzolay (1–1) || — || PNC Park || 17,772 || 45–40 || L2
|- style=background:#fbb
| 86 || July 2 || @ Pirates || 1–5 || Holmes (1–0) || Hendricks (7–6) || — || PNC Park || 14,573 || 45–41 || L3
|- style=background:#fbb
| 87 || July 3 || @ Pirates || 5–6 || Rodríguez (3–3) || Kimbrel (0–1) || — || PNC Park || 17,831 || 45–42 || L4
|- style=background:#bfb
| 88 || July 4 || @ Pirates || 11–3 || Quintana (6–7) || Lyles (5–5) || — || PNC Park || 29,238 || 46–42 || W1
|- style=background:#bfb
| 89 || July 6 || @ White Sox || 6–3 || Lester (8–6) || Giolito (11–3) || Kimbrel (2) ||  || 38,634 || 47–42 || W2
|- style=background:#fbb
| 90 || July 7 || @ White Sox || 1–3 || Nova (4–7) || Hendricks (7–7) || Colomé (20) ||Guaranteed Rate Field || 38,554 || 47–43 || L1
|- style="text-align:center; background:#bff;
| ASG || July 9 || NL @ AL || 3–4 || Tanaka (1–0) (NYY) || Kershaw (0–1) (LAD) || Chapman (1) (NYY) || Progressive Field || 36,747 || – || N/A
|- style=background:#bfb
| 91 || July 12 || Pirates || 4–3 || Rosario (1–0) || Crick (3–5) || Kimbrel (3) || Wrigley Field || 40,740 || 48–43 || W1
|- style=background:#bfb
| 92 || July 13 || Pirates || 10–4 || Lester (9–6) || Lyles (5–6) || — || Wrigley Field || 40,286 || 49–43 || W2
|- style=background:#bfb
| 93 || July 14 || Pirates || 8–3 || Quintana (7–7) || Williams (3–3) || — || Wrigley Field || 39,291 || 50–43 || W3
|- style=background:#fbb
| 94 || July 15 || Reds || 3–6 || Castillo (9–3) || Cishek (2–5) || Iglesias (17) || Wrigley Field || 36,935 || 50–44 || L1
|- style=background:#bfb
| 95 || July 16 || Reds || 4–3  || Cishek (3–5) || Iglesias (2–8) || — || Wrigley Field || 39,788 || 51–44 || W1
|- style=background:#bfb
| 96 || July 17 || Reds || 5–2 || Darvish (3–4) || Gray (5–6) || Kimbrel (4) || Wrigley Field || 37,260 || 52–44 || W2
|- style=background:#bfb
| 97 || July 19 || Padres || 6–5 || Strop (2–3) || Stammen (6–5) || Kimbrel (5) || Wrigley Field || 39,526 || 53–44 || W3
|- style=background:#bfb
| 98 || July 20 || Padres || 6–5 || Quintana (8–7) || Lucchesi (7–5) || Kimbrel (6) || Wrigley Field || 40,314 || 54–44 || W4
|- style=background:#fbb
| 99 || July 21 || Padres || 1–5 || Quantrill (3–2) || Hendricks (7–8) || — || Wrigley Field || 39,954 || 54–45 || L1
|- style=background:#fbb
| 100 || July 22 || @ Giants || 4–5 || Gott (7–0) || Strop (2–4) || Dyson (2) || Oracle Park || 37,119 || 54–46 || L2
|- style=background:#fbb
| 101 || July 23 || @ Giants || 4–5 (13) || Coonrod (1–0)|| Brach (3–3) || — || Oracle Park || 39,747 || 54–47 || L3
|- style=background:#bfb
| 102 || July 24 || @ Giants || 4–1 || Ryan (3–1) || Beede (3–4) || Kimbrel (7) || Oracle Park || 37,746 || 55–47 || W1
|- style=background:#fbb
| 103 || July 26 || @ Brewers || 2–3 || Houser (4–4) || Kintzler (2–1) || Hader (23) || Miller Park || 40,566 || 55–48 || L1
|- style=background:#fbb
| 104 || July 27 || @ Brewers || 3–5  || Peralta (5–3) || Kimbrel (0–2) || — || Miller Park || 43,931 || 55–49 || L2
|- style=background:#bfb
| 105 || July 28 || @ Brewers || 11–4 || Brach (4–3) || Davies (8–4) || — || Miller Park || 43,544 || 56–49 || W1
|- style=background:#fbb
| 106 || July 30 || @ Cardinals || 1–2 || Gallegos (3–1) || Darvish (3–5) || Martínez (11) || Busch Stadium || 46,123 || 56–50 || L1
|- style=background:#bfb
| 107 || July 31 || @ Cardinals || 2–0 || Hendricks (8–8) || Mikolas (7–11) || Kimbrel (8) || Busch Stadium || 43,750 || 57–50 || W1
|-

|- style=background:#fbb
| 108 || August 1 || @ Cardinals || 0–8 || Flaherty (5–6) || Lester (9–7) || — || Busch Stadium || 46,811 || 57–51 || L1
|- style=background:#bfb
| 109 || August 2 || Brewers || 6–2 || Quintana (9–7) || Davies (8–5) || — || Wrigley Field || 41,424 || 58–51 || W1
|- style=background:#bfb
| 110 || August 3 || Brewers || 4–1 ||Wick (1–0)|| Guerra (3–3) || Kimbrel (9) || Wrigley Field || 41,186 || 59–51 || W2
|- style=background:#bfb
| 111 || August 4 || Brewers || 7–2 || Darvish (4–5) || Houser (4–5) || Chatwood (2) || Wrigley Field || 40,466 || 60–51 || W3
|- style=background:#bfb
| 112 || August 5 || Athletics || 6–5 || Wick (2–0) || Treinen (6–4) || Phelps (1) || Wrigley Field || 40,721 || 61–51 ||W4
|- style=background:#fbb
| 113 || August 6 || Athletics || 4–11 || Anderson (10–7) || Lester (9–8) || — || Wrigley Field || 40,627 || 61–52 || L1
|- style=background:#bfb
| 114 || August 7 || Athletics || 10–1 || Quintana (10–7) || Bailey (9–8) || — || Wrigley Field || 41,179 || 62–52 || W1
|- style=background:#bfb
| 115 || August 8 || @ Reds || 12–5 || Chatwood (5–1) || Gausman (3–8) || — ||  || 20,111 || 63–52 || W2
|- style=background:#fbb
| 116 || August 9 || @ Reds || 2–5 || Bauer (10–8) || Darvish (4–6) || Iglesias (23) || Great American Ball Park || 31,569 || 63–53 || L1
|- style=background:#fbb
| 117 || August 10 || @ Reds || 1–10 || Gray (7–6) || Hendricks (8–9) || Romano (2) || Great American Ball Park || 39,866 || 63–54 || L2
|- style=background:#bfb
| 118 || August 11 || @ Reds || 6–3 || Phelps (1–0) || Lorenzen (0–3) || Strop (10) || Great American Ball Park || 31,929 || 64–54 || W1
|- style=background:#fbb
| 119 || August 13 || @ Phillies || 4–2 || Parker (2–2) || Ryan (3–2) || Neris (21) ||  || 26,442 || 64–55 || L1
|- style=background:#fbb
| 120 || August 14 || @ Phillies || 1–11 || Nola (11–3) || Hamels (6–4) || — || Citizens Bank Park || 27,204 || 64–56 || L2
|- style=background:#fbb
| 121 || August 15 || @ Phillies || 5–7 || Suárez (4–1) || Strop (2–5) || — || Citizens Bank Park || 37,064 || 64–57 || L3
|- style=background:#fbb
| 122 || August 16 || @ Pirates || 2–3 || Kela (2–0) || Kintzler (2–2) || — || PNC Park || 29,746 || 64–58 || L4
|- style=background:#bfb
| 123 || August 17 || @ Pirates || 2–0 || Lester (10–8) || Brault (3–2) || Wick (1) || PNC Park || 28,359 || 65–58 || W1
|- style=background:#bfb
| 124 || August 18 || @ Pirates || 7–1 || Quintana (11–7) || Keller (1–2) || — || BB&T Ballpark at Historic Bowman Field || 2,503 || 66–58 || W2
|- style=background:#bfb
| 125 || August 20 || Giants || 5–3 || Hamels (7–4) || Abad (0–1) || Kimbrel (10) || Wrigley Field || 36,969 || 67–58 || W3
|- style=background:#bfb
| 126 || August 21 || Giants || 12–11 || Kintzler (3–2) || Moronta (3–7) || Kimbrel (11) || Wrigley Field || 38,619 || 68–58 || W4
|- style=background:#bfb
| 127 || August 22 || Giants || 1-0 || Hendricks (9-9) || Samardzija (9–10) || Wick (2) || Wrigley Field || 36,366 || 69–58 || W5
|- style=background:#fbb
| 128 || August 23 || Nationals || 3–9 || Sánchez (8–6) || Lester (10–9) || — || Wrigley Field || 39,889 || 69–59 || L1
|- style=background:#fbb
| 129 || August 24 || Nationals || 2–7 || Suero (4–7) || Quintana (11–9) || — || Wrigley Field || 41,159 || 69–60 || L2
|- style=background:#fbb
| 130 || August 25 || Nationals || 5–7 (11) || Hudson (7–3) || Chatwood (5–2) || — || Wrigley Field || 40,518 || 69–61 || L3
|- style=background:#bfb
| 131 || August 27 || @ Mets || 5–2 || Darvish (5–6) || Stroman (7–12) || — || Citi Field || 34,158 || 70–61 || W1
|- style=background:#bfb
| 132 || August 28 || @ Mets || 10–7 || Ryan (4–2) || Syndergaard (9–7) || Kimbrel (12) || Citi Field || 33,987 || 71–61 || W2
|- style=background:#bfb
| 133 || August 29 || @ Mets || 4–1 || Lester (11–9) || deGrom (8–8) || Kimbrel (13) || Citi Field || 38,389 || 72-61 || W3
|- style=background:#bfb
| 134 || August 30 || Brewers || 7–1 || Quintana (12–8) || Anderson (6–4) || — || Wrigley Field || 40,276 || 73–61 || W4
|- style=background:#fbb
| 135 || August 31 || Brewers || 0–2 || Guerra (8–4) || Hamels (7–5) || Hader (27) || Wrigley Field || 40,178 || 73–62 || L1
|-

|- style=background:#fbb
| 136 || September 1 || Brewers || 0–4 || Jackson (1–0) || Chatwood (5–3) || — || Wrigley Field || 40,912 || 73–63 || L2
|- style=background:#bfb
| 137 || September 2 || Mariners || 5–1 || Phelps (2–0) || Wisler (3–3) || — || Wrigley Field || 39,133 || 74–63 || W1
|- style=background:#bfb
| 138 || September 3 || Mariners || 6–1 || Lester (12–9) || Hernández (1–5) || — || Wrigley Field || 33,958 || 75–63 || W2
|- style=background:#bfb
| 139 || September 5 || @ Brewers || 10–5 || Quintana (13–8) || Albers (5–5) || — || Miller Park || 31,007 || 76–63 || W3
|- style=background:#fbb
| 140 || September 6 || @ Brewers || 1–7 || Davies (9–7) || Hamels (7–6) || — || Miller Park || 38,139 || 76–64 || L1
|- style=background:#fbb
| 141 || September 7 || @ Brewers || 2–3 || Hader (3–5) || Kintzler (3–3) || — || Miller Park || 44,323 || 76–65 || L2
|- style=background:#fbb
| 142 || September 8 || @ Brewers || 5–8 || Suter (1–0) || Lester (12–10) || Hader (29) || Miller Park || 44,271 || 76–66 || L3
|- style=background:#bfb
| 143 || September 9 || @ Padres || 10–2 || Hendricks (10–9) || Quantrill (6–7) || — || Petco Park || 22,420 || 77–66 || W1
|- style=background:#fbb
| 144 || September 10 || @ Padres || 8–9 || Báez (1–1) || Cishek (3–6) || — || Petco Park || 25,497 || 77–67 || L1
|- style=background:#fbb
| 145 || September 11 || @ Padres || 0–4 || Paddack (9–7) || Hamels (7–7) || — || Petco Park || 24,203 || 77–68 || L2
|- style=background:#bfb
| 146 || September 12 || @ Padres || 4–1 || Darvish (6–6) || Lamet (2–5) || — || Petco Park || 22,501 || 78–68 || W1
|- style=background:#bfb
| 147 || September 13 || Pirates || 17–8 || Lester (13–10) || Brault (4–5) || Mills (1) || Wrigley Field || 39,080 || 79–68 || W2
|- style=background:#bfb
| 148 || September 14 || Pirates || 14–1 || Hendricks (11–9) || Marvel (0–2) || — || Wrigley Field || 39,928 || 80–68 || W3
|- style=background:#bfb
| 149 || September 15 || Pirates || 16–6 || Wieck (1–0) || Williams (7–7) || — || Wrigley Field || 39,103 || 81–68 || W4
|- style=background:#bfb
| 150 || September 16 || Reds || 8–2 || Mills (1–0) || Gausman (3–9) || — || Wrigley Field || 33,753 || 82–68 || W5
|- style=background:#fbb
| 151 || September 17 || Reds || 2–4 || Gray (11–7) || Darvish (6–7) || Iglesias (32) || Wrigley Field || 34,267 || 82–69 || L1
|- style=background:#fbb
| 152 || September 18 || Reds || 2–3  || Garrett (5–3) || Norwood (0–1)|| Iglesias (33) || Wrigley Field || 36,578 || 82–70 || L2
|- style=background:#fbb
| 153 || September 19 || Cardinals || 4–5  || Miller (5–5) || Kimbrel (0–3) || Gallegos (1) || Wrigley Field || 39,524 || 82–71 || L3
|- style=background:#fbb
| 154 || September 20 || Cardinals || 1–2 || Helsley (2–0) || Phelps (2–1) || Martínez (22) || Wrigley Field || 39,106 || 82–72 || L4
|- style=background:#fbb
| 155 || September 21 || Cardinals || 8–9 || Gant (11–1) || Kimbrel (0–4) || Martínez (23) || Wrigley Field || 40,071 || 82–73 || L5
|- style=background:#fbb
| 156 || September 22 || Cardinals || 2–3 || Webb (2–1) || Darvish (6–8) || Miller (6) || Wrigley Field || 38,606 || 82–74 || L6
|- style=background:#fbb
| 157 || September 24 || @ Pirates || 2–9 || Liriano (5–3) || Hendricks (11–10) || — || PNC Park || 9,989 || 82–75 || L7
|- style=background:#fbb
| 158 || September 25 || @ Pirates || 2–4 || Feliz (4–4) || Wieck (1–2) || Kela (1) || PNC Park || 10,592 || 82–76 || L8
|- style=background:#fbb
| 159 || September 26 || @ Pirates || 5–9 || Musgrove (11–12) || Quintana (13–9) || — || PNC Park || 10,529 || 82–77 || L9
|- style=background:#bfb
| 160 || September 27 || @ Cardinals || 8–2 || Wieck (2–2) || Miller (5–6) || — || Busch Stadium || 46,530 || 83–77 || W1
|- style=background:#bfb 
| 161 || September 28 || @ Cardinals || 8–6 || Cishek (4–6) || Wainwright (14–10) || Kintzler (1) || Busch Stadium || 46,971 || 84–77 || W2
|- style=background:#fbb
| 162 || September 29 || @ Cardinals || 0–9 || Flaherty (11–8) || Holland (2–5) || — || Busch Stadium || 47,212 || 84–78 || L1
|-

|- style="text-align:center;"
| Legend:       = Win       = Loss       = PostponementBold = Cubs team member

Season standings

Record vs. opponents

Opening Day starters

Season summary

March 

March 9 – The Cubs announced Jon Lester will be the opening day starter on March 28 against the Texas Rangers at Globe Life Park.
March 28 – On Opening Day, Javier Báez hit two home runs and drove in four runs and the Cubs easily defeated the Rangers 12–4. Jon Lester allowed two runs in six innings of work. Kris Bryant also homered and drove in three runs in the easy win.
 March 30 – Following a scheduled off day, the Cubs jumped out early on the Rangers and led 3–0 after the first. Yu Darvish struggled and only pitched 2.2 innings while walking seven and giving up three runs. José Quintana, slated as the fifth starter in the Cubs rotation, relieved and pitched four innings while allowing two runs. Kyle Schwarber homered and had three hits as did Willson Contreras. However, Carl Edwards Jr. walked two and gave up a three-run homer in the eighth as the Cubs lost 8–6.
March 31 – In game three against the Rangers, Cole Hamels gave up five runs in five innings of work including a grand slam to Delino DeShields Jr. The Cub bullpen also gave up five runs. The Cub offense continued its hot start as Anthony Rizzo and Schwarber each homered. Trailing 10–9 in the eighth, Daniel Descalso then drove in Báez to tie it, but Pedro Strop threw a wild pitch in the bottom of the ninth to allow the winning run to score as the Cubs lost 11–10. Despite scoring 28 runs in the three-game series, the Cubs left Texas with a 1–2 record.

April 

 April 1 – Kyle Hendricks started for the Cubs as they visited the Atlanta Braves at Sun Trust Park. The Cubs committed six errors in the game and were blown out 8–0, falling to 1–3 on the season.
April 3 – Following a scheduled off day, Jon Lester pitched six innings while allowing only two runs. He left with a 4–2 lead on the strength of a Willson Contreras two-run homer. However, the Cub bullpen imploded again as Steve Cishek walked the first three batters in the eighth and Randy Rosario gave up a bases-clearing double to give the Braves a 5–4 lead. The Cubs would go on to lose 6–4.
April 4 – Cubs pitching continued to struggle as the Braves jumped out to 9–0 lead against Yu Darvish and several relievers. The Cubs managed to score four runs in the ninth as Anthony Rizzo and Javier Báez hit back-to-back home runs, but it was not enough as the Cubs lost their fifth straight game 9–4.
April 5 – The Milwaukee Brewers out-slugged the Cubs in their first clash of the season. Down 13–5, the Cubs rallied, but fell short losing 13–10. Starting pitcher José Quintana lasted only three innings in the loss.
April 6 – Jason Heyward had his first multi-homer game as a Cub and Cole Hamels pitched six innings as the Cubs took an early 7–2 lead. A seven-run inning for the Cubs gave the Cub bullpen the cushion it needed as it continued to struggle, giving up six runs in four innings. Javier Báez and Victor Caratini homered for the Cubs in the 14–8 win over the Brewers.
April 7 – Kyle Hendricks lasted only four innings and gave up all four Milwaukee runs in Chicago's seventh loss of the season. Willson Contreras hit his third home run of the season, but the Cubs could manage only two runs in the 4–2 loss.
April 8 – The Cubs returned home to face the Pittsburgh Pirates for opening day at Wrigley Field. The Cubs jumped to an early lead following three errors by Pirate shortstop Kevin Newman in the third inning. Kyle Schwarber homered for the Cubs in the 10–0 win. Jon Lester left the game after pitching three-plus innings with a hamstring issue and the Cub bullpen held the Pirates scoreless for six innings.
April 10 – Yu Darvish allowed five runs in 5.1 innings of work, but the Cub offense struggled with the frigid weather conditions, managing only two runs on six hits. The 5–2 loss to the Pirates dropped the Cubs to 3–8 on the season.
April 11 – Starter José Quintana pitched into the seventh inning with 11 strikeouts and gave up just four hits in the Cubs win 2–0 over the Pirates. Pedro Strop got his first save. Daniel Descalso and Victor Caratini each had two hits and an RBI.
April 12 – The Cubs scored three runs in the first inning and went on to beat the Mike Trout-less Los Angeles Angels 5–1. Cole Hamels secured his second win by pitching well. Anthony Rizzo hit a first inning two run homer, Willson Contreras added two solo home runs, and David Bote also homered in the win
April 13 – A late inning rally fell short as the Angels beat the Cubs 6–5. Javier Báez hit three doubles but four walks by Cub relievers allowed two runs to score in the top of the sixth inning. A Mark Zagunis pinch-hit single scored two runs in the eight inning to narrow the lead. A ninth inning Angel error led to another Cub run but, with runners at second and third, Willson Contreras struck out. A check-swing third strike call on Kyle Schwarber ended the game as the Cubs lost 6–5. The Cubs record fell to 5–9.
April 15 – After the prior day's game being postponed due to snow, the Cubs traveled to Miami to face the Marlins. With the Cubs scoring three runs in the first inning, Yu Darvish pitched into the fifth inning allowing only two runs and striking out eight. Javier Báez hit his 100th double, WillsonContreras hits his sixth home run of the season, and the bullpen pitched well for a 7–2 victory.
April 16 – José Quintana pitched into the seventh inning and Javier Báez had his third three-hit game in a row including his fifth homer of the season. Daniel Descalso, David Bote, and Ben Zobrist drove in the other runs in the 4–0 shutout of the Marlins.
April 17 – Cole Hamels improved to 3–0 on the season, pitching seven innings while allowing three hits and striking out eight. Daniel Descalso continued his productive start with three RBI's. Jason Heyward drove in a run and Javier Báez drove in two with a double and his sixth home run on the season. The 6–0 victory was a sweep of the Marlins and improved the Cubs' record to 8–9.
April 19 – After an off day, the Cubs returned home to face the Arizona Diamondbacks. Kyle Hendricks pitched seven shutout innings while striking out 11 as the pitching staff continued its streak of good performances. Kris Bryant doubled in two runs in the second and scored a run as the Cubs won easily 5–1. The win returned the Cubs to the .500 mark on the season.
April 20 – Yu Darvish gave up three runs on five hits and walked three while the Cub bullpen also allowed three runs. The Cub offense was shut down by D-backs' start Zack Greinke and the Cubs lost 6–0, ending their four-game winning streak.
April 21 – Starting for the first time on the season, Tyler Chatwood pitched six scoreless innings and only walked two batters. Javier Báez tripled in a run in the sixth to give the Cubs a 1–0 lead. However, Pedro Strop gave up a solo home run in the ninth to blow his first save of the season. Báez then led off the ninth with a double and advanced to third on an error setting up David Bote's game-winning single as the Cubs won 2–1. The win again moved the Cubs to the .500 mark on the season.
April 23 – After another off day, the Cubs returned home to face the Los Angeles Dodgers. José Quintana continued his streak of good starts, pitching seven innings while only allowing two runs. Willson Contreras drove in three runs with a bases-clearing double in the first to give the Cubs an early lead. Anthony Rizzo hit a two-run homer and Javier Báez homered as well as the Cubs beat the Dodgers 7–2. The win moved the Cubs to one game above .500 for the first time since opening day.
April 24 – With Cole Hamels on the mound, the Cubs fell behind 3–0 entering the bottom of the sixth inning against the Dodgers. Javier Báez then connected on a three-run home run to tie the game at three. Three batters later, Jason Heyward hit his fifth home run of the season, a three-run shot to give the Cubs the 6–3 lead. Steve Cishek allowed a three-run homer in the eighth, but Pedro Strop notched the save as the Cubs won 7–6. The win moved the Cubs to a season-high two games over .500.
April 25 – Jon Lester returned from the IL and pitched five innings while allowing only one unearned run on an error by Javier Báez. The Cub bullpen allowed another run to score and the Cubs trailed the Dodgers 2–0 going in to the ninth. Albert Almora Jr. homered with two outs in the ninth, but it was not enough as the Cubs fell 2–1.
April 26 – The Cubs next traveled to Arizona to face the D-Backs. In the first game of the series, Kyle Hendricks gave up seven runs in five innings of work as the Cubs lost 8–3. Kris Byrant and Javier Báez both homered in the loss as the Cubs returned to .500 on the season.
April 27 – A day later, Yu Darvish pitched six innings while allowing only one run. David Bote hit two home runs and drove in five while Anthony Rizzo also homered as the Cubs routed the Diamondbacks 9–1.
April 28 – José Quintana was staked to an early 3–0 Cub lead behind home runs by Kris Bryant and Willson Contreras. However, Quintana surrendered three D-Back runs in two of his last three innings of work and left the game tied at three. The game went to extra innings where the Cubs had a plethora of opportunities to win the game, but failed to cash in until the 15th inning when Ben Zobrist doubled to drive in two runs. The Cubs added an insurance run on a Kris Bryant sacrifice fly to take a 6–3 lead to the bottom of the 15th. After two quick outs, Kyle Ryan then gave up two runs to narrow the lead to one, but Allen Webster got the final out to earn his first career save and give the Cubs a 6–5 win.
April 30 – The Cubs next traveled to Seattle for a two-game series against the Mariners. Daniel Descalso led off the game with his second home run of the season and Anthony Rizzo hit his sixth. Cole Hamels allowed four runs in 5.1 and the Cubs trailed 5–4 in the eighth inning. Kyle Schwarber hit a mammoth two-run homer to give the Cubs a 6–5 lead. Steve Cishek pitched a clean ninth and earned his first save of the year.

May 
May 1 – The Cubs hit three home runs and cruised to an easy 11–0 victory in the finale against the Mariners, their fourth in a row. Javier Báez, Willson Contreras, Anthony Rizzo, and Ben Zobrist each had driven in two runs while Jason Heyward had three hits in the easy win. Jon Lester threw seven scoreless innings while allowing only one hit. The win marked the Cubs fifth in a row as they moved with 2.5 games of the division lead.
May 3 – After an off day, the Cubs returned home to face the first place St. Louis Cardinals. Anthony Rizzo's 199th career home run, a three-run homer, was all the Cubs needed as they beat the Cardinals 4–0. Kyle Hendricks pitched a complete game while allowing only four hits. He threw only 81 pitches, 63 of which were strikes, as the Cubs dominated the Cardinals and moved within a 1.5 games of first.
May 4 – The Cubs and Yu Darvish fell behind early against the Cardinals in game two of the series and trailed 5–1 in the fourth. Back-up catcher Taylor Davis hit his first career home run, a grand slam to tie the game at five. Javier Báez gave the Cubs the lead in the eighth with his 11th homer of the season. The 6–5 win moved the Cubs to within half a game of the Cardinals for first place and marked the Cubs sixth straight win.
May 5 – In spite of four errors, the Cubs easily beat the Cardinals to complete the sweep and earn their seventh straight win. The Cubs notched eight extra base hits, including a grand slam by Kris Bryant in a six-run eighth inning. Jose Quintana scattered eight hits in six innings while allowing only two runs. The win improved the Cubs to 19–12 on the season and moved them into first place in the Central Division.
May 6 – Riding a seven-game winning streak and in first place for the first time since opening day, the Cubs welcomed the Marlins to Wrigley. Cole Hamels allowed three runs in six innings, but left with a 4–3 lead behind a two-run homer by Anthony Rizzo and RBI singles by Willson Contreras and Kyle Schwarber. Pedro Strop walked the first two batters in the eighth and allowed a single to load the bases. A third walk forced in the tying run and Strop was removed from the game. The Marlins pushed across two more runs in the ninth to take a 6–4 lead. Kris Bryant homered in the ninth to narrow the lead to one and Rizzo singled to put the tying run on with one out, but Javier Báez and Contreras struck out to end the game. The loss dropped the Cubs out of first place.
May 7 – Jon Lester allowed two runs, none earned, on eight hits in six innings, but left with the game tied at two. The Cubs threatened to break the tie on several occasions in the late innings, but entered the ninth still tied. Kris Bryant removed all doubt, hitting a three-run home run in the bottom of the ninth to give the Cubs the 5–2 walk-off win and returned them to first place.
May 8 – Addison Russell made his first appearance of the season after being suspended for 40 games for domestic violence and started at second base for the Cubs. Kyle Hendricks gave up a run in the first and surrendered five hits, but lasted eight innings and left with a 2–1 Cub lead over the Marlins. However, the Cub bullpen surrendered the lead in the ninth without Pedro Strop who had been placed on the injured list prior to the game. The game went to extra innings tied at two before Jason Heyward hit a solo home run in the bottom of the 11th to mark a second straight walk-off home run game for the Cubs.
May 9 – In the final game of the series against the Marlins, Kris Bryant and Anthony Rizzo each homered and Mike Mongtomery pitched five scoreless innings in relief of Yu Darvish to notch his first win of the season. The 4–1 win kept the Cubs in first place and moved them to nine games over .500.
May 10 – With a 1.5 game lead over the Brewers, the Cubs welcomed Milwaukee to Wrigley for the first time on the season. Jose Quintana allowed three runs in 6.2 innings and the Cub bullpen fell apart, allowing four more runs as the Cubs were shut out 7–0. The win moved the Brewers to within half a game of the Cubs for first.
May 11 – Cole Hamels pitched seven innings and allowed only one run, but the Cubs went to extra innings against the Brewers tied at one. Tyler Chatwood pitched the final four innings of the game, striking out seven and Willson Contreras hit the game-winning home run in the bottom of the 15th to give the Cubs a 2–1 win.
May 12 – Appearing on Sunday Night Baseball for the second consecutive week, Jon Lester scattered nine hits and allowed one unearned run in 6.2 innings of work. Javier Báez and Willson Contreras each drove in a run and Kris Bryant hit a two-run home run in the seventh to give the Cubs the 4–1 win. The series win over the Brewers kept the Cubs in first place in the NL Central. Anthony Rizzo missed the game with a sore back.
May 14 – Following an off day, the Cubs traveled to Cincinnati to take on the Reds. Kyle Hendricks drove in two runs with a double in the second and pitched eight innings while allowing only one run. Willson Contreras also drove in the run as the Cubs beat the Reds 3–1. The win moved the Cubs to a season-high 11 games over .500. Anthony Rizzo missed his second straight game with a sore back.
May 15 – Addison Russell hit his first home run since returning to the Cubs from suspension while Albert Almora Jr. and Kyle Schwarber also homered for the Cubs against the Reds. Yu Darvish allowed two runs in 5.1 innings of work, but the Cub bullpen surrendered three runs in the seventh and eighth innings to force extra innings. In the 10th, the Cubs lost 6–5. 
May 16 – In the final game of the series against the Reds, the Cubs scored two runs in the first, but failed to score the rest of the game. José Quintana gave up three runs before a rain delay and Tyler Chatwood allowed another run in two innings of work as the Cubs lost 4–2. The loss marked the Cubs first series loss since early April.
May 17 – A day later, the Cubs offense woke from its slumber in the previous game and scored 14 runs against the Washington Nationals in Washington D.C. Kris Bryant homered in three consecutive innings, the seventh, eighth, and ninth, marking his second three-home run game of his career. Kyle Schwarber, Albert Almora Jr, and Willson Contreras also homered for the Cubs as the scored 14 runs and blew out the Nationals 14–6.
May 18 – Facing Stephen Strasburg, the Cub offense again cooled off, managing only two runs on four hits. Meanwhile, Jon Lester struggled, allowing five runs on 10 hits in 4.1 innings of work in the 5–2 loss to the Nationals.
May 19 – Playing on Sunday Night Baseball for the third consecutive week, the Cubs scored a run in each of the first four innings to take a 4–0 lead. The Cubs pushed the lead to 6–1 in the sixth, before Kyle Hendricks gave up a three-run home run. The Cub bullpen surrendered another run, but Steve Cishek pitched 2.1 innings of relief for the save as the Cubs beat the Nationals 6–5. Javier Báez left the game with a foot injury.
May 20 – Returning home, the Cubs faced their former pitcher Jake Arrieta and the Philadelphia Phillies. The Cubs took an early one-run lead on Anthony Rizzo RBI single. However, Yu Darvish allowed three runs in the sixth to surrender the lead. Trailing by two in the eighth, Daniel Descalso tripled in a run and scored on a throwing error to give the Cubs a 4–3 lead heading to the ninth. However, Brad Brach could not hold the lead and the Phillies tied it to force extra innings. A J.T. Realmuto home run in the 10th sealed the loss for the Cubs. Javier Báez missed the game due to a foot injury suffered the day before.
May 21 – José Quintana pitched six innings and allowed no runs, leaving the game with a 1–0 lead. However, Carl Edwards Jr. surrendered the lead in the seventh. Trailing 2–1 in the bottom of the ninth with the bases loaded, Albert Almora Jr. hit a weak ground ball to the pitcher, but Kris Bryant was able to beat the throw to the plate to score the tying run. Javier Báez, who did not start the game due to his foot injury, pinch hit and drove the first pitch to right field to drive in the winning run as the Cubs beat the Phillies 3–2.
May 22 – With temperatures near 80 and the wind blowing out, Cole Hamels struggled against his former team. The Phillies took a 3–0 lead before Anthony Rizzo hit a towering three-run home run in the third to tie it. Albert Almora Jr. broke the tie in the fifth with his first career grand slam. Javier Báez also homered for the Cubs. Hamels, who allowed nine hits and three runs, was lifted after four innings and replaced by Tyler Chatwood. Chatwood pitched four innings in relief while allowing one run and earned the win as the Cubs won 8–4. The win returned the Cubs to 11 games over the .500 mark as they led the division by two games.
May 23 – Jon Lester struggled again, allowing seven runs in four innings of work and leaving the game trailing 7–3. Trailing 8–3 in the seventh, Kyle Schwarber hit a two-run homer and Anthony Rizzo hit a solo homer to bring the Cubs within two. However, they could get no closer as the Phillies won 9–7.
May 24 – The Cubs welcomed the Reds to Wrigley Field for a three-game series. Kyle Hendricks pitched six innings and allowed three runs and left with the game tied at three. Willson Contreras singled to drive in the go-ahead run in the eighth, but Steve Cishek gave up a two-run homer to Eugenio Suárez in the ninth as the Cubs lost 6–5. 
May 25 – Yu Darvish pitched seven innings despite allowing 12 hits and six runs and left the game with a 6–5 lead behind homers by Albert Almora Jr., Jason Heyward, and Addison Russell. Tyler Chatwood pitched the ninth to earn his first save of the season as the Cubs beat the Reds 8–6.
May 26 – José Quintana gave up 12 hits and six runs in five innings of work. The Cub bullpen also struggled, allowing fours runs in a 10–2 loss to the Reds. Kris Bryant and Jason Heywood collided in right field on a play in the sixth inning forcing Bryant to leave the game.
May 27 – The Cubs next traveled to Houston to face the Astros for a three-game series. In the first game of the series, Cole Hamels struggled, allowing six runs in four innings of work. The Cub bullpen, however, pitched five innings of scoreless relief. However, despite home runs by Anthony Rizzo, Albert Almora Jr., and Addison Russell, the Cubs fell to the Astros 6–5. Kris Bryant and Jason Heyward sat out the game after running into each other in the outfield the previous day.
May 28 – Jon Lester struggled for the third consecutive start, giving up seven runs in 5.2 innings of work. Brad Brach struggled as well, allowing two runs in 1.1 innings of work. As a result, despite hitting five home runs in the games (Jason Heyward, Addison Russell, David Bote twice, and Kyle Schwarber), the Cubs lost to the Astros 9–6. Kris Bryant missed his second straight game following a collision with Jason Heyward in the outfield.
May 29 – Kyle Hendricks pitches eight strong innings and allowed only one run. Kyle Schwarber and Kris Bryant, in his return to the lineup, each homered as the Cubs held on for the 2–1 win over the Astros to avoid the sweep. The Cubs set a team record with 50 home runs in a month.
May 31 – The Cubs traveled to St. Louis to face the Cardinals and Yu Darvish pitched well, allowing only one run on three hits in six innings. Darvish also drove in the Cubs only run of the game with sacrifice fly in the second inning. The game remained tied into the 10th inning, when the Matt Carpenter singled with the bases loaded to give the Cardinals the 2–1 win. The loss reduced the Cubs' division lead to half a game over the Brewers.

June 
June 1 – José Quintana pitched four innings and allowed two runs before being forced from the game following a three and a half hour rain delay. The Cubs entered the rain delay tied at two on the strength of home runs by Anthony Rizzo and Jason Heyward. Resuming play around 11:30 pm local time, Tyler Chatwood allowed three runs in two innings as the Cubs fell to the Cardinals 7–4. The loss dropped the Cubs to half a game out of first, behind the Brewers. Javier Báez missed the game as he continued to struggle with a foot injury.
June 2 – Cole Hamels pitched seven innings while allowing only one unearned run and left trailing 1–0. Brad Brach surrendered a run in the eighth to put the Cubs down two to the Cardinals entering the ninth inning. Willson Contreras walked with one out and moved to third on a Jason Heyward single. An Addison Russell groundout moved the score to 2–1, but David Bote struck out to end the game as the Cubs were swept by the Cardinals and fell 1.5 games out for first place in the division.
June 3 – In a make-up game for an earlier snowed out game, the Cubs routed the Los Angeles Angels by a score of 8–1. Jon Lester, after struggling his previous three starts, allowed one run in seven innings of work. Javier Báez homered and drove in three while Jason Heyward drove in two runs. Willson Contreras homered as well in the win. Newly signed Carlos Gonazalez made his Cub debut and drove in a run.
June 4 – Kyle Hendricks struck out ten Colorado Rockies in seven innings in a 6–3 victory. Kyle Scharber and Javier Báez each homered in the win while Carlos González drove in two runs. Pedro Strop returned to the lineup to pitch a perfect ninth and record the save. The win moved the Cubs in to a tie for first in the division with the Brewers.
June 5 – Yu Darvish allowed three runs in 5.1 innings of work and the Cubs were led by David Bote career-high seven RBI, including a three-run home run. Up 8–3, the Cub bullpen struggled, but the Cubs held on for the 9–8 win. The Cubs moved one game ahead of Milwaukee in the NL Central.
June 6  – José Quintana pitched 7.1 innings, but allowed three runs. The Cub offense struggled against Rockies' starter Peter Lambert making his MLB debut. Javier Báez drove in the only Cub run as the Rockies avoided the sweep, winning 3–1.
June 7 –  A two-run home run by Javier Báez in the first inning was all Cole Hamels needed as the Cubs welcomed the Cardinals to Wrigley Field. Hamels allowed no runs in eight innings before yielding to Pedro Strop in the ninth. Strop allowed a Paul DeJong home run, but held on for the 3–1 victory.
June 8 – Jon Lester surrendered four runs in the first inning, but did not allow another run in six innings of work. Victor Caratini hit a tie-breaking bases-loaded double in Chicago's four-run sixth inning as the Cubs rallied to beat the Cardinals 9–4. Kyle Schwarber homered and drove in two in the win.
June 9 – Kyle Hendricks continued his streak of strong performances, pitching seven innings while scattering eight hits and allowing only one run. Carlos González hit his first home run as a cub and Kyle Schwarber drove in two runs as the Cubs beat the Cardinals 5–1 and earned a second series sweep of the Cardinals on the season.
June 10 – The Cubs returned to the road to face the Rockies in Denver. Kyle Schwarber and Anthony Rizzo both hit two-run homers in the Cubs’ third inning, but Yu Darvish quickly surrendered the lead in the bottom half of the inning. The Rockies took the lead in the seventh, but the Cubs rallied to tie it in the eighth. Steve Cishek then surrendered the lead in the bottom half of the eighth as the Cubs fell short and lost 6–5.
June 11 – José Quintana struggled, allowing four runs in 4.2 innings. The Cub bullpen fared no better, allowing six more Rockies' runs as the Cubs were blown out 10–3. The loss marked the Cubs' fifth consecutive road loss.
June 12 – Cole Hamels pitches seven shutout innings against the Rockies and drove in two runs as the Cubs avoided the series sweep. Kyle Schwarber hit a three-run home run and Javier Báez added a two-run shot as the Cubs rolled to an easy 10–1 win over the Rockies.
June 13 – The Cubs next visited Los Angeles to visit the Dodgers, holders of the best record in the National League. The Cubs jumped to an early three-run lead in the first game of the series behind a two-run homer by Kyle Schwarber and a solo homer by Kris Bryant. However, Jon Lester struggled again, giving up six runs in five innings as the Cubs lost to the Dodgers 7–3.
June 14 – In game two of the series, the Cubs again took an early lead, this time on a two-run homer by Anthony Rizzo. However, Kyle Hendricks struggled, allowing five runs in only 4.1 innings. Kris Bryan homered for the second straight game for the Cubs, but it was not enough as they lost to the Dodgers 5–3.
June 15 – Yu Darvish pitched well, allowing only one run in seven innings. However, the Cub offense failed to score through eight innings. In the ninth, Anthony Rizzo hit a two-run home run  to rally the Cubs past the Dodgers 2–1.
June 16 –  In the final game of the series against the Dodgers, José Quintana gave up two runs in five innings, but the Cubs rallied to tie it in the sixth on an RBI single by Willson Contreras and a sacrifice fly by David Bote. Steve Cishek again gave up the go-ahead run in the bottom of the eighth and, though the Cubs had runners on second and third with one out in the ninth, the Cubs lost 3–2.
June 18 –  Cole Hamels continued to pitch well as the Cubs welcomed the Chicago White Sox to Wrigley Field. Hamels allowed one run in seven innings, but left with the game tied at one as the Cub offense struggled. Still tied at one in the ninth, Eloy Jiménez, who had been traded by the Cubs for José Quitana two years prior, hit a two-run homer to give the White Sox the 3–1 win.
June 19 –  Facing likely AL All-Star starting pitcher Lucas Gioloto, the Cubs pounded out seven runs including a first-inning grand slam by Willson Contreras. Contreras homered again in the third and David Bote also homered as the Cubs won 7–3, splitting the two-game series against the White Sox.
June 20 –  The following day, the New York Mets paid a visit to Wrigley to start a four-game series. With Kyle Hendricks on the DL, Tyler Chatwood started for the Cubs and allowed three runs in four innings. Adbert Alzolay, making his Major League debut, pitched four-plus innings of relief and allowed only one run, earning the win for the Cubs. Javier Baez homered and drove in two runs while Anthony Rizzo drove in two as well giving the Cubs the 7–4 win.
June 21 – In game two against the Mets, Yu Darvish failed to build on his prior good start, allowing four runs in six innings. Addison Russell homered to give the Cubs a 4–3 lead in the fifth, but Darvish surrendered the lead for the second time in the game in the sixth. In the seventh, Brad Brach allowed a run-scoring single and the Cubs lost 5–4.
June 22 – José Quitana allowed nine runs, eight earned, as the Cubs were blown out by the Mets 10–2.
June 23 – Javier Báez hit a three-run home run in the eighth to give the Cubs a 5–3 win over the Mets in the final game of the series. Cole Hamels pitched well for the Cubs, lasting seven innings and allowing only three runs. The win kept the Cubs half a game ahead of the Brewers in the Central.
June 24 – The Atlanta Braves came to Chicago for a four-game series. In the first game, Willson Contreras and Jason Heyward homered and the Cubs used a five-run fifth inning to beat the Braves 8–3. Contreras drove in three runs in the game and Jon Lester pitched well, allowing only two unearned runs in six innings. The win moved the Cubs a full game ahead of the Brewers for first in the Central.
June 25 – Adbert Alzolay started his first game and gave up a first-pitch home run to Ronald Acuna Jr., but pitched well from there, allowing no more runs and pitching into the fifth. The Cubs took the lead in the fourth on a two-RBI double by Willson Contreras. However, Mike Mongtomery gave up a two-run home run in the seventh and the Cubs could muster no further offense, losing 3–2. The Cubs remained a game ahead of the Brewers despite the loss.
June 26 – Yu Darvish gave up five runs in five innings of work while the Willson Contreras and Kris Bryant homered for the Cubs. However, it was not enough as the Cubs lost to the Braves 5–3.
June 27 – Looking to avoid the sweep, Tyler Chatwood struggled in his third start on the season, allowing six runs in five innings. However, the Cubs rallied to score nine runs as Victor Caratini homered twice and Kyle Schwarber also homered. Jason Heyward also drove in three runs. Newly acquired relief pitcher Craig Kimbrel made his Cubs debut and pitched a shaky ninth to earn his first save as a Cub in the 9–7 win over the Braves.
June 28 – The Cubs next traveled to Cincinnati to take on the Reds. Cole Hamels left after one inning with an oblique injury and Mike Montgomery gave up five runs in 2.1 innings as the Cubs lost 6–3.
June 29 – José Quintana scattered six hits in six innings of scoreless work while Jason Heyward hit a solo home run in the second to give the Cubs a 1–0 lead. With the Cubs still holding to the 1–0 lead in the eighth, Javier Báez hit a grand slam to push the lead to 5–0. The Cubs would go on to beat the Reds 6–0.
June 30 – Jon Lester gave up three runs in the first and four runs in five innings as the Cubs trailed the Reds 4–0 heading to the seventh. Albert Almora Jr. drove in the Cubs' first run in the seventh and Kyle Scharber homered to draw the Cubs within 4–3. However, Dillon Maples and Kyle Ryan allowed three runs in the eighth. A three-run Jason Heyward homer in the ninth narrowed the lead, but the Cubs fell 8–6.

July 
July 1 – The Cubs next traveled to Pittsburgh to face the Pirates. Adbert Alzolay made his second career start and was shelled, allowing seven runs in 2.2 innings. The Cub bullpen fared no better, allowed 11 runs in 5.1 innings of relief. Javier Báez hit his 21st homer on the season, but it was not enough as the Cubs were blown out 18–5.
July 2 – Kyle Hendricks returned to the mound for the Cubs, but gave up two runs in three innings before a rain delay ended his night. The Cub bullpen allowed three more runs as the Cubs were again blown out by the Pirates 5–1.
July 3 – The Cubs took an early lead on a Victor Caratini solo home run, but Yu Darvish allowed four runs in 6.2 innings to surrender the lead. The Cubs retook the lead in the seventh on a second homer by Caratini. In the ninth, Craig Kimbrel allowed two runs to blow the save as the Cubs lost their third straight to the Pirates 6–5.
July 4 – In the final game of the four-game series against the Pirates, the Cubs took an early lead and cruised to an easy win. Robel Garcia homered in his second game as a Cub and Kris Bryant, Albert Almora Jr., and Willson Contreras also homered in the 11–3 win. José Quintana earned the win while pitching seven innings and allowing three runs. Joe Maddon was ejected in the fourth inning after getting upset by inside pitches by Pirate pitchers.
July 6 – After a rare Friday off day, the Cubs returned to Chicago to face the White Sox at Guaranteed Rate Field. The Cubs used a five-run fifth to take the lead as Javier Báez, Kris Bryant, and Anthony Rizzo each drove in two runs. The White Sox managed only three runs as the Cubs won 6–3.
July 7 – On the final day before the All-Star break, Kyle Hendricks gave up four runs in four innings as the Cub offense again struggled. A seventh inning solo home run by Robel Garcia marked the only run for the Cubs as they lost to the White Sox 3–1. The Cubs remained in first place by half a game over the Brewers at the All-Star break.
July 12 – The Cubs returned home following the All-Star break to face the Pirates at Wrigley Field. Yu Darvish pitched well, striking out eight and allowing no runs in six innings of work. However, he left the game with the game scoreless. In the bottom of the seventh, Kris Bryant homered, Robel Garcia drove in a run on a sacrifice fly, David Bote drew a walk with the bases loaded as the Cubs took a 3–0 lead. However, in the top of the eighth, Pedro Strop gave up a three-run homer to Starling Marte to tie the game. Jason Heyward gave the Cubs the lead again in the bottom half of the eight on a single that drove in Bryant. Craig Kimbrel pitched a perfect ninth to nail down the 4–3 win. The win moved the Cubs 1.5 games ahead of the Brewers for the division lead.
July 13 – In game two of the series against the Pirates, the Cubs batted around and scored seven runs in the first inning. Willson Contreras hit a three-run homer, Javier Báez doubled in a run, and Anthony Rizzo and Jon Lester each drove in a run with a single to give the Cubs the early lead. The Cubs pushed the lead to 10–0 on a Jon Lester home run in the third and a two-run scoring double by Addison Russell in the fourth. Lester pitched well, allowing three runs in 6.2 innings as the Cubs won easily 10–4. The win kept the Cubs 1.5 games ahead of the Brewers in the division.
July 14 – In the series finale, the Cubs took an early 1–0 lead on a second inning Robel Garcia double. However, José Quintana would surrender three runs in the third as the Cubs fell behind 3–1. Quintana would partially atone for the runs he allowed, driving in a run in the fourth on a single. Victor Caratini tied the game on a sacrifice fly in the fifth and Jason Heyward gave the Cubs the lead for good with a two-run homer. Leading 5–3 in the sixth, Albert Almora Jr. and Kyle Schwarber hit back-to-back solo home runs while Anthony Rizzo drove in another run with a sacrifice fly. The Cub bullpen would hold the lead as the Cubs beat the Pirates 8–3. The win moved the Cubs to 2.5 games ahead of the Brewers in the division.
July 15 – The Reds were the Cubs next opponent for the Cubs at Wrigley, and they took an early 1–0 lead off of Kyle Hendricks in the first. Hendricks went on to allow two runs in six innings. A Kyle Schwarber homer tied the game for the Cubs in the third. The Cubs took the lead on a Jason Heyward groundout and a wild pitch in the fourth. With the Cubs lead 3–2 in the seventh, Steve Cishek gave up a home run and a David Bote error allowed another run to score as the Cubs fell down 4–3. The Reds added two more runs in the eighth and the Cubs lost 6–3.
July 16 – Alec Mills made his first start of the season as the newly acquired Martin Maldonando also started at catcher for the Cubs in game two against the Reds. Mills allowed three runs, all in the first, in a six inning start. The Cubs narrowed the lead to 3–2 in the second on a two-run home run by Robel Garcia. The Cubs tied it in the sixth on a Kris Bryant homer in the sixth. The game remained tied through nine innings before Kyle Schwarber hit a solo home run in the bottom of the 10th to beat the Reds 4–3. The win kept the Cubs's lead in the division at 2.5 games.
July 17 – Kris Bryant and Addison Russell hit solo home runs to stake Yu Darvish to an early 2–0 lead. Darvish again pitched well, pitching six scoreless innings. Jason Heyward drove in two runs with a seventh inning double and Anthony Rizzo also drove in a run in the eighth to push the lead to 5–2. Craig Kimbrel pitched a perfect ninth to secure the win over the Reds. The win marked Darvish's first win at Wrigley Field as a Cub. With a Brewers win later that day, the division lead remained at 2.5 games.
July 19 – After an off day, the Cubs welcomed the San Diego Padres to Wrigley. The Padres jumped out to an early 3–0 lead against Jon Lester. However, Anthony Rizzo hit a grand slam in the bottom of the third, his first homer since June 15, to give the Cubs a 4–3 lead. Lester, who surrendered 12 hits in six innings, surrendered the lead again in the fifth, but a Javier Báez homer gave the Cubs a 5–4 lead in the bottom half. Pedro Strop continued to struggle and gave up a home run on the first pitch of the eighth to again tie the game. However, the Cubs retook the lead in the bottom of the half on an error by Padre first baseman Eric Hosmer. Craig Kimbrel pitched a scoreless ninth for his fifth save as a Cub.
July 20 – The Cubs took an early 2–0 lead on the Padres on an Anthony Rizzo groundout and Robel Garcia triple in the first inning. José Quintana relinquished the lead in the third, allowing two homers. Rizzo drove in a run in the bottom of the third on a single, but Quintana again gave up the lead in the fourth. However, Javier Báez gave the Cubs the lead again in the bottom of the fourth with a three-run homer. Quintana surrendered another homer run in the fifth, but the Cub bullpen held the lead as the Cubs won 6–5. The win moved the Cubs to three games in front of the Brewers for the division lead.
July 21 – Kyle Hendricks pitched seven strong innings and allowed only two runs, but the Cub offense could only manage an RBI-groundout by Anthony Rizzo in the first. The Cub bullpen imploded in the ninth, surrendering three runs as the Cubs fell 5–1. The loss moved the division lead to two games over the Brewers.
July 22 – Alec Mills made his second start of the season for the Cubs as they visited the San Francisco Giants in San Francisco. Mills allowed two runs in 4.1 innings, but left with the lead on the strength of home runs by Robel Garcia and Kyle Schwarber and an RBI-single by Albert Almora Jr. An Anthony Rizzo double in the eighth pushed the Cub lead to 4–2, but Pedro Strop blew the lead in the bottom of the eighth, giving up three runs as the Cubs lost 5–4. The loss reduced the Cubs' division lead to 1.5 games over the Cardinals.
July 23 – Facing the Giants' Madison Bumgarner, the Cubs took an early 2–1 lead on RBI-singles by Kris Bryant in the first and third. However, Yu Darvish allowed three runs in the fourth to give the Giants a 4–2 lead. A Victor Caratini single in the seventh narrowed the lead and Jason Heyward tied it with a single in the eighth. The game went to extra innings and the Cubs failed to get any runners on base through the 13th. In the bottom of the 13th, Pablo Sandoval homered to win the game for the Giants.
July 24 – In the final game of the series, the Cubs jumped to an early 3–0 lead on home runs by Javier Báez and Kris Bryant. Tyler Chatwood, starting in place of Jon Lester who missed the game because he was ill, allowed one run in four innings of work. The Cub bullpen held the Giants scoreless as Craig Kimbrel earned his seventh save as a Cub in the 4–1 win.
July 26 – After an off day, the Cubs traveled to Milwaukee to face the Brewers with a slim one-game lead over the Cardinals in the division. Kyle Hendricks held the Brewers scoreless through five innings before he was lifted from the game. The Cubs took the lead in the sixth on a two-run homer by David Bote. However, the Cub bullpen then allowed three runs to give up the lead and the Cubs lost 3–2. The loss moved the Cubs into a first place tie with the Cardinals.
July 27 – Jon Lester pitched seven innings while allowing no runs as the Cubs again took the lead, this time on a two-run home run by Anthony Rizzo, against the Brewers. However, once again, the Cub bullpen fell apart, allowing two runs in the eighth to force extra innings. Albert Almora Jr. homered in the top of the 10th, but Craig Kimbrel allowed a home run in the bottom half by Christian Yelich to tie the game. Keston Hiura homered two batters later as Kimbrel failed to record an out and the Cubs lost 5–3. The loss moved the Cubs to a game behind the Cardinals in the division.
July 28 – In the final game of the series against the Brewers, Kyle Schwarber hit a grand slam in the second and a three-run home run in the fourth to give the Cubs a 7–0 lead. José Quintana surrendered three runs in the fifth before being pulled from the game, but the Cubs extended the lead to seven again on a three-run homer by Victor Caratini. The win moved the Cubs back into a first-place tie with the Cardinals with the Brewers one game behind in the division.
July 30 – After another off day, the Cubs traveled to St. Louis to take on the Cardinals. Yu Darvish continued to pitch well for the Cubs, allowing two runs in six innings. However, the Cub offense managed only one run on a Javier Báez single as the Cubs lost and fell a game behind the Cardinals in the division.
July 31 – Kyle Hendricks pitched seven innings and allowed no runs while scattering seven hits. Ian Happ drove in his first run of the season on a single in the sixth and Javier Báez scored in the eighth from second on an attempted pick off to give the Cubs a 2–0 lead. Craig Kimbrel allowed a single and double in the bottom of the ninth, but induced a weak grounder and struck out Yairo Munoz to end the game. The win moved the Cubs back in to a first-place tie with the Cardinals.

August 
August 1 – In the final game of the series against the Cardinals, Jon Lester allowed five runs in five innings while the Cub bullpen surrendered an additional three runs. The Cubs were blown out 8–0. The loss moved the Cubs to 21–33 on the road and dropped the Cubs a game behind the Cardinals in the division.
August 2 – The Cubs returned home to face the Brewers at Wrigley. Jason Heyward hit his first lead-off home run as a Cub and Javier Báez also homered and drove in three as the Cubs beat the Brewers 6–2. José Quintana pitched well, allowing only two runs in six innings. The win moved the Cubs to within a half game of the Cardinals for the division lead.
August 3 – Cole Hamels made his first appearance since leaving with a strained oblique in June and pitched five scoreless innings. Javier Báez scored on a wild pitch in the second to give the Cubs a 1–0 lead, but newly acquired David Phelps surrendered the lead in the sixth. With the game tied at one in the seventh, Albert Almora Jr. hit a solo home run to give the Cubs the lead and drove in a run on a sacrifice fly in the eighth. A Báez single plated another run and the Cubs beat the Brewers 4–1. The win moved the Cubs half a game ahead of the Cardinals for the division lead.
August 4 – Going for the sweep against the Brewers with Yu Darvish on the mound, the Cubs took the lead on a homer and a run-scoring triple by Jason Heyward. Nicholas Castellanos singled to drive in Heyward as the Cubs took an early 3–1 lead in the second. Kyle Schwarber homered while Tony Kemp and David Bote also drove in runs as the Cubs thumped the Brewers 7–2. Tyler Chatwood pitched the final three innings for the win. Coupled with a Cardinals' loss later in the day, the Cubs moved their division lead to 1.5 games.
August 5 – The Oakland A's next visited Wrigley. Nicholas Castellanos hit his first homer as a Cub in the first, but Kyle Hendricks surrendered a two-run homer to Marcus Semien in the third to give the A's a 2–1 lead. Javier Báez tied it in the sixth on a solo home run and Ian Happ hit his first homer on the season for the Cubs in the seventh to give the Cubs a 3–2 lead. Later in the seventh, Castellanos doubled in a run before Báez hit his second homer of the game to give the Cubs a 6–2 lead. Steve Cishek struggled, giving up three runs in the eighth, but the Cub bullpen was able to stop the bleeding and the Cubs held on for the 6–5 dub. The win pushed the Cubs' division lead to 2.5 games over the Cardinals.
August 6 – Jon Lester gave up 11 runs, 10 earned, in four innings of work as the Cubs were blown out by the A's 11–4. Kris Bryant homered and drove in two runs while Kyle Schwarber also drove in two runs in the loss.
August 7 – José Quintana continued to pitch well, allowing only one run in seven innings against the A's. Ian Happ hit a grand slam in the fourth while Kyle Schwarber and Victor Caratini also homered as the Cubs routed the A's 10–1.
August 8 – The Cubs returned to the road to face the Reds. Cole Hamels struggled, giving up five runs in three innings of work, but the Cub bullpen pitched well as the Cubs blew out the Reds 12–5. Nicholas Castellanos homered twice and Ian Happ homered and drove in four in the drubbing of the Reds. The win pushed the Cubs' division lead to 3.5 games.
August 9 – Yu Darvish allowed four runs in six innings while the Cubs only managed one run, a Nicholas Castellanos home run, against Reds' starter Trevor Bauer. Anthony Rizzo drove in a run in the eighth with the bases loaded and no outs on a hit by pitch, but the Cubs failed to score another run in the inning. As a result, the Cubs lost 5–2.
August 10 – Kyle Hendricks lasted only 2.2 innings while giving up seven runs against the Reds. The Cub bullpen surrendered three more runs as the Cubs were blown out 10–1. Kyle Schwarber homered for the Cubs in the loss.
August 11 – In the final game of the series against the Reds, Jon Lester gave up three runs in five innings and left trailing 3–0. Javier Báez drove in a run in the sixth with an RBI double to narrow the lead to 3–1. In the seventh, Tony Kemp drove in a run on a groundout and Kris Bryant hit a three-run home run to give the Cubs a 5–3 lead. Rowan Wick pitched two innings of shutout relief and Pedro Strop pitched the ninth to earn the save.
August 13 – After an off day, the Cubs traveled to Philadelphia to take on the Phillies. Jose Quintana struck out a career-high 14 batters and allowed only two runs in six innings. However, the Cub offense struggled once again, managing only two runs on a Nicholas Castellanos homer and a Javier Báez RBI sacrifice fly. The Cub bullpen gave up two more runs and the Cubs lost 4–2. The loss narrowed the Cubs' division lead over the Cardinals to one game.
August 14 – Cole Hamels continued to struggle as he was pounded by his former team, giving up eight runs in two innings to the Phillies. The Cubs managed only a Kris Bryant solo home run as they lost 11–1. The loss moved the Cubs into a first-place tie with the Cardinals.
August 15 – Looking to avoid the series sweep, Yu Darvish pitched well, striking out 10 in seven innings of work and not allowing a run. The Cub offense pushed across five runs on homers by Anthony Rizzo and Kyle Schwarber. RBI singles by Albert Almora Jr. and Rizzo and an RBI double by David Bote gave the Cubs a 5–0 lead. The Cub bullpen allowed one run in the eighth, but the Cubs still led 5–1 going into the ninth. However, Rowan Wick, Pedro Strop, and Derek Holland fell apart in the ninth giving up six runs, including Holland allowing the game-ending grand slam to Bryce Harper as the Cubs lost 7–5. The Cubs remained tied in first with the Cardinals despite the loss.
August 16 – The Cubs next traveled to Pittsburgh to face the struggling Pirates. Kyle Hendricks pitched well, allowing only one run in seven innings of work. However, the Cub offense managed nothing until the eighth inning when Tony Kemp tripled to score two runs and give the Cubs the 2–1 lead. In the ninth, Kyle Ryan allowed a single with one out and was relieved by Brandon Kintzler. Kintzler retired the first batter he faced and intentionally walked Josh Bell. An unintentional walk followed and loaded the based before Kintzler walked another batter to force in the tying run. Kevin Newman then singled in the winning run as the Cubs blew another lead. The loss moved the Cubs to second place, a game behind the Cardinals.
August 17 – In game two of the series against the Pirates, the Cubs again struggled to score before Kris Bryant homered in the seventh and Ian Happ scored on an errant pick-off play in the eighth to give the Cubs a 2–0 lead. Rowan Wick pitched a perfect ninth for the save and the Cubs returned to a first-place tie with the Cardinals.
August 18 – The Cubs and Pirates next traveled to Williamsport, PA to participate in the Little League Classic at BB&T Ballpark at Historic Bowman Field. The Cub offense finally broke out, scoring seven runs in the first five innings behind home runs by Nicholas Castellanos, Jason Heyward, and Anthony Rizzo. Kyle Schwarber also drove in two runs as the Cubs held on for the 7–1 win. The win left the Cubs in a first-place tie with the Cardinals. The win also marked the Cubs first road series win since May.
August 20 – After an off day, the Cubs returned home to face the Giants. Cole Hamels allowed three runs in six innings while Nicholas Castellanos and Anthony Rizzo each hit solo home runs in the first. Rizzo added a second solo home run in the third and went 3–3 with three runs scored and two RBI. Jonathan Lucroy drove in the go-ahead run in the fifth and Tony Kemp extended the lead in the seventh with a sacrifice fly. The Cub bullpen allowed one base runner in three innings of relief as the Cubs won 5–3. The lost kept the Cubs one-half game behind the Cardinals for the division lead.
August 21 – The Cubs jumped out to an early lead over the Giants, scoring six runs in the first three innings behind two-run home runs by Nicholas Castellanos and Kyle Schwarber. Yu Darvish and Castellanos added run-scoring singles to give the Cubs a 6–2 lead after three. Darvish allowed two more runs in the fifth and five in the sixth to surrender the Cubs lead. Trailing 9–7 in the bottom of the sixth, the Cubs pushed across three more runs to retake the lead at 10–9. However, Tyler Chatwood relinquished the lead again in the seventh as the Giants took an 11–10 lead. Still trailing by one in the bottom of the eighth, Castellanos walked to lead off the inning and Kris Bryant homered to give the Cubs the lead once again. Craig Kimbrel pitched a perfect ninth for the save as the Cubs won 12–11. Following a Cardinals' loss, the Cubs moved into sole possession of first place, half a game ahead of St. Louis.
August 22 – Kyle Hendricks pitched seven shutout innings and Anthony Rizzo drove in Jason Heyward on a single up the middle to score the only run of the game. The 1–0 win over the Giants kept the Cubs half a game ahead of the Cardinals in the division.
August 23 – The Nationals, winners of nine of their last 10 games, came to Wrigley and forced Jon Lester from the game in the fifth after giving up six runs. The Cubs managed only three runs, all in the bottom of the ninth, as the Cubs were blown out 9–3. The loss dropped the Cubs half a game behind the Cardinals for the division lead.
August 24 – José Quintana gave up five runs in four innings as the Nationals jumped all over the Cubs for a second straight game, taking 5–1 lead. An RBI-single by Nicholas Castellanos and a double by Jonathan Lucroy accounted for the Cubs only two runs as the Cubs lost again 7–2. The loss moved the Cubs 1.5 games out of the division lead. Anthony Rizzo left the game with back tightness.
August 25 – Looking to avoid the series sweep, Cole Hamels lasted five innings and allowed only two runs. However, Rowan Wick struggled, allowing three runs in seventh as the Cubs fell behind 5–2. A Victor Caratini homer in the bottom of the seventh reduced the lead to 5–3 and Kyle Schwarber tied it in the eighth with a two-run homer. In extra innings, the Nationals scored one run on a wild pitch by Tyler Chatwood and added another on a single by Anthony Rendon as the Cubs lost again 7–5. The loss moved the Cubs 2.5 games behind the Cardinals for the division lead. Anthony Rizzo missed the game with continued back issues.
August 27 – After an off day, the Cubs traveled to New York to face the Mets. Yu Darvish pitched eight innings and allowed only one run. He issued his first walk since July 23 in the game, but shut down the Mets. The Cub offense, led by two-run homers by Javier Báez and Addison Russell, scored enough for the 5–2 win. The Cubs remained 2.5 games behind the Cardinals in the division. Anthony Rizzo missed his second straight game with a bad back.
August 28 – The Cub offense continued to pound the ball as they scored 10 runs in the first three innings off Mets' starter Noah Syndergaard. Kyle Hendricks struggled as well, allowing six runs in 4.2 innings, but the Cub bullpen held on for a 10–7 win. Ian Happ, Kyle Schwarber, and Nicholas Castellanos homered for the Cubs in the win. Anthony Rizzo again missed the game due to a bad back. The win pulled the Cubs within two games of the Cardinals for the division lead.
August 29 – Jon Lester allowed five hits and walked three, but only allowed one run in six innings of work against the Mets. Victor Caratini hit two home runs, including a three-run tiebreaking homer in the seventh to give the Cubs a 1 4–1 win. The Cubs narrowed their division deficit to 1.5 games with the sweep over the Mets. Anthony Rizzo missed his fourth straight game.
August 30 – The Cubs returned home to face the Brewers at Wrigley Field. The Cub offense continued to put up runs, scoring five in the first two innings two homers by Nicholas Castellanos and an RBI-double by starter Jose Quintana. Kyle Schwarber also homered as the Cubs beat the Brewers 7–1. The win moved the Cubs within one game of first place. Anthony Rizzo missed his fifth straight game.
August 31 – Cole Hamels pitched six innings and allowed two runs, but the Cubs were blanked by the Brewers' pitching and lost 2–0. The loss with a Cardinal doubleheader sweep moved the Cubs to 2.5 games out of first. Anthony Rizzo returned to the lineup for the first time since August 24.

September
September 1 – The Cub offense continued to struggle against the Brewers failing to score for the second straight game and losing 4–0. The loss moved the Cubs to three games out of the division lead. Javier Baez left the game due to a thumb injury
September 2 – The Cubs next welcomed the Seattle Mariners to Wrigley for a brief two-game series. The Cub offense continued to struggle, failing to score a run until the seventh when Anthony Rizzo drove in a run and Kyle Schwarber had a bases-clearing triple. The Cubs pulled out the 5–1 win to stay within three games of the Cardinals. Javier Baez missed his second straight game.
September 3 – Willson Contreras homered in his return to the lineup while Nicholas Castellanos and Kyle Schwarber also homered as the Cubs beat the Mariners 6–1. Jon Lester pitched six innings, allowing six hits, but no runs in the win. The win again only kept the Cubs within three games of the Cardinals. Javier Baez missed his third straight game. Ben Zobrist returned to the lineup for the first time since May 6.
September 5 – After an off day, the Cubs traveled to Milwaukee to face the Brewers in a four-game series. A five-run sixth inning, highlighted by a grand slam by Kyle Schwarber pushed the Cubs into the lead as they won 10–5. Jose Quintana only last give innings while allowing four runs, but earned the win as the Cubs moved to within 2.5 games of the Cardinals. Javier Baez missed his fourth straight game.
September 6 – Cole Hamels allowed five runs in 3.1 innings as the Cubs were blown out by the Brewers 7–1. The sole Cub run coming on a Nicholas Castellanos home run in the third. A Cardinals' loss kept the Cubs 2.5 games out of the division lead. Javier Baez missed his fifth straight game.
September 7 – A 1–1 tie in the eighth was broken on an Anthony Rizzo bases loaded walk. The Cubs could manage no further runs in the inning despite having the bases loaded with no outs. Yasmani Grandal homered on the first pitch of the bottom of the eighth off of David Phelps to tie the game at two. In the bottom of the ninth, Christian Yelich doubled home the game-winning run as the Cubs lost 3–2. The loss moved the Cubs 3.5 games behind the Cardinals for the division lead. Javier Baez missed his sixth straight game.
September 8 – In the final game of the series, Jon Lester surrendered eight runs in 5.1 innings and the Cubs fell behind 8–3. Two runs in the ninth on a Jason Heyward home run were not enough as the Cubs lost their third straight, 8–5. The loss moved the Cubs to 4.5 games behind the Cardinals for the division lead and only 1.5 games ahead of the Arizona Diamondbacks for the second wild card spot. Javier Baez missed his seventh straight game. 
September 9 – Looking to stay in the division race, the Cubs traveled to San Diego to take on the Padres in a four-game series. Due to injuries to Javier Baez and Addison Russell, the Cubs called up their top prospect Nico Hoerner to play shortstop against the Padres. Hoerner went 3–4 with a triple and four RBIs in his debut. Nicholas Castellanos and Kyle Schwarber both homered as the Cubs won 10–2. Kyle Hendricks scattered seven hits and allowed two runs in 5.2 innings to earn the win. The win moved the Cubs to within four games of the Cardinals for the division lead and two games ahead of the Brewers in the hunt for the second wild card spot. It was announced prior to the game, the Javier Baez had a hairline fracture in his left thumb and would miss the remainder of the regular season.
September 10 – Jose Quintana gave up six runs, four earned, in three innings of work as the Cubs fell behind 7–2 in the third. Kris Bryan hit a two-run home run in the fifth to narrow the lead to 6–5. After Brandon Kintzler surrendered two runs in the seventh, Bryany hit his second homer of the day, another two-run shot to narrow the lead. Jason Heyward followed with a solo home run to tie it at eight. In extra innings, Steve Cishek allowed a single and walked three straight batters to force in the winning run as the Cubs lost 9–8. The lost left the Cubs four games behind the Cardinals for the division lead, but narrowed the wild card lead to one game.
September 10 – The Cub offense was shut down by the Padres as the Cubs lost 4–0. The loss moved the Cubs into a tie for the second wild card spot with the Brewers. 
September 11 – Yu Darvish struck out 14 Padres in six innings of work and did not allow a run. Ian Happ drove in two runs as the Cubs salvaged a series split, winning 4–1. The win kept the Cubs four games behind the Cardinals and tied with the Brewers.
September 12 – Returning home to Wrigley to face the Pirates, Jon Lester gave up four runs in the first inning, but the Cubs scored five in the bottom half of the inning on home runs by Nicholas Castellanos, Willson Contreras, and Nico Hoerner in the first pitch he saw in his Wrigley debut. The Cubs pounded out five more runs in the third on a second homer by Contreras and a grand slam by Anthony Rizzo. The Cubs added seven more in the fifth as they blew out the Pirates 17–8. Nico Hoerner and Rizzo each drove in four runs in the game. The win kept the Cubs within four games of the Cardinals for the division lead, and moved them one game ahead of the Brewers.
September 13 – Kyle Hendricks pitched six innings and allowed only one run as the Cub offense continued to put up runs. Ben Zobrist, Kris Bryant, Nico Hoerner, and Victor Caratini all homered for the Cubs as they dismantled the Pirates 14–1. Bryant drove in four runs and Hoerner drove in three runs in the easy win. The win moved the Cubs to within three games of the Cardinals for the division lead. 
September 14 – For third consecutive game, the Cub offense put up at least 14 runs as the Cubs swept the Pirates winning 16–6. Kris Bryant, Ian Happ, Kyle Schwarber, and Jonathan Lucroy all homered for the Cubs in the win. Jose Quintana, however, only lasted two innings and allowed five runs as he continued to struggle. The win moved the Cusb within two games of the Cardinals for the division lead. Anthony Rizzo left the game with an ankle injury.
September 15 – With the Reds coming to Wrigley, the Cub offense continued to score runs. Kyle Schwarber homered and drove in three while Nicholas Castellanos drove in two runs. Cole Hamels only allowed two runs, but lasted only 3.1 innings as the Cubs won 8–2 winning their fifth straight game. The win kept the Cubs within two games of the Cardinals and one game ahead of the Brewers. Prior to the game, it was announced that Anthony Rizzo would likely miss the rest of the regular season with his ankle injury.
September 16 – Kyle Schwarber hit a three-run homer in the first to give the Cubs the early lead. Cole Hamels gave up two runs in just 3.1 innings of work, but the Cub bullpen shut out the Reds. The Cubs added two in the sixth on an RBI-double by Jason Heyward and Ben Zobrist single. An Ian Happ single in the eighth extended the lead to 6–2 and Nicholas Castellanos drove in two on a double as the Cubs won 8–2. The win moved the Cubs half a game behind the Nationals for the wild card spot and two games behind the Cardinals for the division lead.
September 17 – Yu Darvish struck out eight Reds in a row at one point setting a Cub record for consecutive strikeouts, but still gave up four runs. For the first time in four games, the Cub offense was held in check, managing only two runs as the Cubs lost 4–2. The loss moved the Cubs into a tie with the Brewers two games behind the Cardinals in the division.
September 18 – Jon Lester pitched five plus innings and gave up on run, but the Cub offense was held in check, mustering only four hits and scoring only two runs, one on a Willson Contreras home run. The game went to extra innings before the Cubs lost 3–2 in 10. The loss dropped the Cubs three games behind the Cardinals while still tied with the Brewers for the second wild card spot. The loss was the fourth in a row for the Cubs in a crucial stretch for their playoff hopes.
September 19 – With the Cubs' playoff hopes dwindling, the Cardinals visited Wrigley Field for a four-game series that would likely determine their season. Anthony Rizzo made a surprise return to the lineup and led off. Rizzo hit a solo home run in the third. Kyle Hendricks allowed four runs in 5.1 innings as the Cubs fell behind 4–1. In the bottom of the ninth, the Cubs tied it on an RBI-double by Ben Zobrist, a run-scoring single by Willson Contreras, and an RBI-groundout by Jason Heyward. However, Craig Kimbrel surrendered a home run to Matt Carpenter in the top of the 10th and the Cubs lost 5–4, moving four games behind the Cardinals in the division and a game behind the Brewers for the final wild card spot. Javier Baez pinch ran in the ninth inning, his first appearance in a game since September 1
September 20 – The Cubs pushed across a run in the second on a fielding error, but could not manage to score again. Alec Mills pitched well for 4.2 innings, but David Phelps promptly allowed two runs in the sixth to give the Cardinals a 2–1 win. The loss moved the Cubs five games out of the division lead and two games out of the last wild card spot.
September 21 – The Cubs took an early 3–1 lead in game three of the series, but Jose Quintana surrendered five runs in 3.1 innings of work, surrendering the Cub lead. Ian Happ tied it in the fifth with a two-run homer and Nico Hoerner gave the Cubs a 6–5 lead in the sixth with his third homer of the season. Kyle Ryan gave up the lead again for the Cubs, allowing a two-run homer to Marcel Ozuna in the seventh. A two-run Tony Kemp homer in the seventh gave the Cubs an 8–7 lead. But Craig Kimbrel gave up back-to-back home runs on back-to-back pitches in the ninth and the Cubs fell 9–8. Javier Baez pinch hit in the bottom of the 10th with two outs, but struck out to end the game. The at-bat marked his last on the season. The Cubs fell to six games behind the Cardinals in the division and three games out of the wild card.
September 22 – In the final game of the four-game series, the Cubs were swept by the Cardinals. Yu Darvish pitched well, but surrendered two runs in the top of the ninth and the Cubs lost 3–2, losing their sixth game in a row. The loss eliminated the Cubs from the division and moved them four games out of the wild card with only six games remaining.
September 24 – The Cubs next traveled to Pittsburgh where they were blown out 9–2. Kyle Hendricks gave up six runs in six innings to move the Cubs to the brink of elimination.
September 25 – Jon Lester allowed only two runs on eight hits in six innings, but left the game trailing the Pirates 2–1. After the Cubs tied it in the seventh on an Ian Happ home run, the bullpen gave up two runs in the bottom of the eighth as the Cubs lost 4–2. The loss marked the Cubs eighth straight loss as the Cubs were officially eliminated from playoff contention.
September 26 – Jose Quintana gave up seven runs and 12 hits to the Pirates in five innings of work as the Cubs lost again, 9–5. The loss was the Cubs ninth straight.
September 27 – Traveling to St. Louis for the last series of the season with nothing to play for, the Cubs blew out the Cardinals 8–2. Ian Happ and Robel Garcia homered for the Cubs while Alec Mills pitched well, allowing only one run in five innings of work. The loss ended the Cubs nine-game losing streak.
September 28 – Cole Hamels, making his last start as a Cub, pitched four innings without allowing a run. Kyle Schwarber, Ian Happ, and Victor Caratini homered for the Cubs as the beat the Cardinals 8–6 and prevented the Cardinals from clinching the division.
September 29 – On the final day of the season, the Cubs announced before the game that Joe Maddon would not return as manager for the Cubs. In his final game with the Cubs, the Cubs again looked to prevent the Cardinals from winning the division, but Derek Holland, making a spot start, gave up seven runs in two innings of work and the Cubs were shut out 9–0.

Transactions

March

April

May

June

July

August

September

Roster 
(Contains all players who played in a game for the Cubs during the 2019 season.)

Achievements and records 

 On May 6, Anthony Rizzo hit his 200th career home run, his 199th with the Cubs.
On June 23, Javier Báez hit his 110th career home run.
On August 16, Kyle Schwarber hit his 100th career home run in his 453rd career game, the fastest Cub to 100 home runs ever.

Statistics

Batting 

Note: G = Games played; AB = At bats; R = Runs; H = Hits; 2B = Doubles; 3B = Triples; HR = Home runs; RBI = Runs batted in; SB = Stolen bases; BB = Walks; K = Strikeouts; AVG = Batting average; OBP = On-base percentage; SLG = Slugging percentage; TB = Total bases

Source

Pitching 

Note: W = Wins; L = Losses; ERA = Earned run average; G = Games pitched; GS = Games started; SV = Saves; IP = Innings pitched; H = Hits allowed; R = Runs allowed; ER = Earned runs allowed; BB = Walks allowed; K = Strikeouts

Source

Farm system

Major League Baseball draft

The 2019 Major League Baseball (MLB) First-Year Player Draft began on Monday, June 3, 2019, and ended June 5. The draft will assign amateur baseball players to MLB teams.

2019 Draft Order

2019 Draft Tracker (Chicago Cubs)

Sources

External links
Chicago Cubs 2019 Schedule at MLB.com
2019 Chicago Cubs at ESPN
2019 Chicago Cubs season at Baseball Reference

Chicago Cubs
Cubs
Cubs
Cubs
Chicago Cubs seasons